The green-backed becard (Pachyramphus viridis) is a species of bird in the family Tityridae. It has traditionally been placed in Cotingidae or Tyrannidae, but evidence strongly suggest it is better placed in Tityridae, where it is now placed by the South American Classification Committee. It often includes the Andean yellow-cheeked becard (Pachyramphus xanthogenys) as a subspecies.

It is found in Argentina, Bolivia, Brazil, Guyana, Paraguay, Uruguay, and Venezuela. The green-backed becard's natural habitats are subtropical or tropical moist lowland forest and subtropical or tropical moist montane forest.

References

green-backed becard
Birds of Brazil
Birds of Paraguay
green-backed becard
Taxa named by Louis Jean Pierre Vieillot
Taxonomy articles created by Polbot